Robert Wright (1666 – 12 October 1739) was the son of Sir Robert Wright, Chief Justice of the King's Bench (1687–1689) who died in Newgate Prison following the Glorious Revolution. In the same year Robert was called to the bar at Middle Temple and became a judge.  Robert took the role of Judge of the Common Pleas in the North East of England and married widowed land-heiress Alicea Pitt (née Johnson) (d.1723), daughter of John Johnson of Sedgefield and settled in Sedgefield before returning to London following the Hanoverian succession in 1715.  Meanwhile, he fathered seven children with his mistress Isabella (1675 – 21 November 1752) in Bloomsbury, before sailing for colonial Charles Town to become Chief Justice of the colony of Carolina, and subsequently South Carolina, and a plantation owner.  He died there in 1739.  His son Sir James Wright went on to become a colonial governor of Georgia.

Biography 
Born into the wealthy Wright family of Kilverstone in Norfolk Robert graduated from Caius College Cambridge and became a judge after being called to the bar at Middle Temple.  He was appointed Judge of the Common Pleas of the County Palatine of Durham in the North East of England and married the widow Alicea Pitt (née Johnson) (d.1723) (note that some records such as the marriage records in County Durham archives give the spelling as ‘Alicea and some, such as the tomb of Baldwin Pitt give it as Alicia there in 1689 and as his wife was the heir of her father John Johnson's land he is likely to have gained the titles to the land involved.  It seems he gained titles to further land and property when his sister Anne Wright (d.1731) married local landowner Freville Lambton (1661–1731).  Robert built a mansion house in Sedgefield in 1707 (now The Manor House in Sedgefield) on the land he had gained from Anne's marriage.  Meanwhile, Robert took a mistress in Bloomsbury, Isabella (1675–1752) with whom he had seven children between 1703 and 1716, the first when he was 37 and Isabella was 28.  As a member of the land-owning aristocracy and likely to have influential friends in London's Hanoverian political and social society of the time Robert is likely to have been a Whig and following the Hanoverian succession his interests lay more in the capital than in Sedgefield.  His wife Alicea died in November 1723 and was buried on 27 November 1723 in St. Edmunds Church, Sedgefield. After her death and the death of his sister Alice the same month the following year – Alice and her husband had probably had their home with Robert and his wife – Robert wasted little time in arranging a move to the colony of Carolina with Isabella and their children where fortunes were to be made and he became Chief Justice of the colony and a plantation owner.  His little sister Alice died on 17 November and was buried at Sedgefield on 19 November 1724. He took the position of Chief Justice of Carolina on 27 May 1725 though his appointment was not officially confirmed until 30 November 1730 as Chief Justice of South Carolina by King George II.

In 1733 he was in dispute with the colonial South Carolina Assembly, which objected to his involvement in releasing Surveyor-General James St. John (he had been arrested for opposing the Assembly in its distribution of land which favored Assembly members over commoners). This resulted in the withholding of Wright's chief justice salary for five years because, it was said, he "hath lately invaded and violated the known privileges of this house".  He constantly pursued the outstanding sum up to his death in 1739 and then the cause was taken up by his wife Isabella and son James with limited success, securing £1,000 from £5,000 owed.

Wright died of a fever aged 73, probably in Charles Town (Charleston) in 1739. When he was ill and dying his friend James Oglethorpe wrote to Wright's friend the 1st Duke of Newcastle to advise him.
“The Chief Justice of South Carolina is a very worthy gentleman, I hope he may long continue but as all men are mortal and he is sick of an illness which hath been fatal in Carolina his fate seems clear”.

Lieutenant Governor Bull of Carolina wrote to advise the Commissioners for Trade and Plantations of his death.
“this province has been lately visited with an epidemical fever which raged chiefly in Charleston and carried off great numbers of people, amongst whom died Mr. Justice Wright.”  There was an auction of some of Robert Wright's possessions in 1742 following an advertisement “at the plantation late of Robert Wright esq. deceased, near Dorchester, a parcel of very good slaves and sundry other things”.

The seven children of Robert Wright went on to marry and prosper including Sir James Wright as colonial Governor of Georgia who returned to London after the American War of Independence, died in 1785 and is buried in the north transept of Westminster Abbey.  Their mother, Robert's second wife Isabella, died in 1752.

Background 
Born in 1666 The son of Sir Robert Wright, Chief Justice of the King's Bench (1687–1689) and Baronet of Kilverstone Hall, Kilverstone in Norfolk.  Robert followed his father, to Eton, Caius College Cambridge and then to Middle Temple where he was called to the bar and became a judge in 1669.  Unfortunately for Robert this coincided with the death of his father in Newgate Prison where he had been sent charged with treason by William of Orange following the Glorious Revolution, his father having served King James II.  Sir Robert was considered and inept and corrupt judge and his performance when presiding at the notorious Trial of the Seven Bishops was generally criticised.  For a son of the same name and also a judge it seems London was not a safe place to remain and Robert was appointed Judge of the Common Pleas in the County Palatine of Durham in the North East of England, as far from the capital as he could go at the time, and married the widow Alicea Pitt (née Johnson) (d.1723) in 1689 and thereby likely came to own land titles in the area as Alicea  was the heir to her father John Johnson, a gentleman of Sedgefield and a local land owner.  Robert is likely to have added further to his land titles when his sister Anne Wright married local landowner Freville Lambton of Hardwick Estate in 1695; this will have included the land on which Robert was to build his mansion house in Sedgefield (now the Sedgefield Manor House).

It is not known how Robert's appointment in the North East and his marriage to Alicea, both in the year he was called to the bar and his father died, were arranged. In 1660 Thomas Lambton (1628–1662), a year before his death, married Margaret Freville, daughter of Nicholas Freville who owned Hardwick Estate near Sedgefield and benefitted from a dowry of land which on his death passed back to Nicholas Freville but who bequeathed it to his grandson Freville Lambton, son of Thomas and Margaret.  Freville subsequently married Anne Wright in 1695 who as his sister would have been a dependent of Robert and it is very likely Robert benefitted from a similar land transaction that Thomas had.

Following Robert's marriage to Alicea in 1689 Robert built a mansion house in Sedgefield opposite St. Edmunds Church. The house was built in the style of a Queen Anne mansion house, probably influenced by the designs of Sir Christopher Wren to whom Robert was related through his mother Susan Wright (b. St. Giles in the Fields, London, 25 January 1633 – d.bef.1681, née Wren). Like Kilverstone, Sedgefield was (and still is) a traditional hunting area which would have suited Robert.  At the time of their marriage Robert was 23. There are no baptisms from June 1646 to October 1653 at Sedgefield St. Edmund the Bishop in Stockton district. As Alicia's baptism cannot otherwise be found, it is likely she was born some time in this period and was between 43 and 36 years old at the time of the marriage. Alicia's first husband Baldwin Pitt had been born in 1646, and that would make them about the same age.

The marriage licence of Robert Wright, esquire, of Middle Temple, Middlesex, to marry Alice Pitt, widow, of Sedgefield, dated 4 October 1689 coincides almost perfectly with the probate of the will of his step-grandmother Anne Fettyplace, Lady Scroggs on 30 October 1689. Robert Wright's father Sir Robert Wright had had financial problems even before his ignominious death in Newgate prison. After the death of her surviving parent, Anne Scroggs, Lady Wright (d.1713) or her living relatives may not have had the means even if they had the will to care for her three unmarried step-daughters and step-son in addition to the widow herself and her young son. In addition to dealing with what must have been a deeply personal loss and the crushing blow of the family's fall in society, Robert Wright may at 23 equally unexpectedly also have found himself with the responsibility of three younger sisters to provide for.

The relocation to Sedgefield with three of his four sisters (Anne, Elizabeth and Alice)  the acquisition of land and the marriage to Alicea gave Robert a substantial cover story to cover his links to his father.  He became known as Robert Wright of Sedgefield.

The octagonal font in St. Edmunds Church bears eight coats of arms carved on the instructions of Rector Theophilus Pickering in 1711, one on each face, marking a notable union and there is a one for Lambton impaling Wright (the marriage of Freville Lambton and Anne Wright) and one for Wright impaling Johnson (the marriage of Robert Wright and Alicea Pitt (née Johnson)) probably indicating the beneficence of the families to the church.  Robert also had a private pew which would have been in exchange for a financial contribution to the church and which is still present near the pulpit.

It is evident that Robert retained ties to London as he had his first child there named Isabella after her mother Isabella in 1703 when Robert was 37 and Isabella 28.  Robert's dateable and provable appearance in London society coincides with the ascension of Queen Anne to the throne in 1702.  He went on to father six more children with Isabella between 1703 and 1716.  His fourth son was James who subsequently became Sir James Wright, colonial Governor of Georgia before the American War of Independence.
In 1715 Queen Anne was succeeded by the Hanoverian King George I and, a Jacobite Rebellion was suppressed and London once again became a safe place for Robert.  There is evidence that he began to surrender his titles to land and property in Sedgefield which may be an indication he had little further to do with the area.

Alicia died in November 1723 and was buried in St. Edmunds Church on 27 November. In My Zeal for the Real Happiness of Both Great Britain and the Colonies: The Conflicting Imperial Career of Sir James Wright Robert G. Brooking states that one week later in December Robert married Isabella Bulman at St. Giles in the Fields, London.  It was known as a ‘marriage mill’, a convenient church for a speedily arranged marriage.

At least two records exist of the marriage of Robert Wright, widower, and Isabella Bulman, a spinster from St. Giles in the Fields, a bond from 4 December 1723, and an allegation from 11 December 1723. In the allegation, Robert Wright is said to be 40 years old, and Isabella Bulman 26 years old. This does not match up with the ages of the actual couple at the time, as Robert Wright would have been about 57 years old and Isabella 48. It seems unlikely therefore, that this is the marriage in question. If an official ceremony ever took place at all before or after their departure to the New World, it seems it must be looked for elsewhere.

Others sources state that Isabella's maiden name was Wright. «Robert, son of Sir Robert Wright [q. v.], lord chief justice of England, married Mrs. Pitts, whose maiden name was Isabella Wright.»

One possibility, especially with how successfully the story seems to have been hushed up over centuries, is that she was kith or kin.

According to Davy's Suffolk Collections in Addit. MS. 19156, folio 233, previously at the British Museum, now in the British Library, Isabella was the "youngest daughter of .... Wright".

At this time Carolina was a developing colony in the New World and a desirable place for wealthy and influential men from Great Britain to emigrate.  It was also in need of reform of the system of Lord Proprietors who owned shares in the colony and apparently in need of a chief justice.  Being the son of the infamous judge Sir Robert Wright was still inconvenient for Robert as was his family situation—he had seven children by a mistress he had recently married.  A relocation across the Atlantic would have appealed.

Trade and correspondence with Carolina was done at the Carolina Coffee House on Birching Lane (now Birchin Lane) near St. Paul's Cathedral in the City of London and we can imagine that arrangements for Roberts move to Carolina and his appointment as Chief Justice was done here.
Robert made the voyage to Charles Town (Charleston)  with Isabella and their seven children having ' arrived' in January 1726.  An eye-witness account of their arrival exists by resident Elizabeth Hyrne writing to her brother Burrell Massingberd in Lincolnshire. Elizabeth writes in her letter which she dates 21 January 1725:

Being one, Elizabeth Hyrne wrote as an 18th-century woman. What to her would have been 21 January 1725 would to us, the modern reader, be 21 January 1726, as New Years Day was not until Lady Day, 25 March, at the time.

There are other references to Robert Wright and his son Sir James Wright in colonial America that make reference to ‘Isabella Pitts’ or Robert being married to ‘the widow Pitts’.  This is a confusion of both wives Alicea Pitt and Isabella and it may be that Robert was keen to foster the confusion so that his duplicitous past would not be known in the place where he had at last established a new life away from both the stigma of his father and the double life he led with two women between Sedgefield and Bloomsbury.
Before or on arrival in Carolina Robert became Chief Justice on 27 May 1725 though his position as Chief Justice of South Carolina (the colony having divided into North Carolina and South Carolina in 1729) wasn't officially confirmed as Chief Justice of South Carolina by King George II until 30 November 1730.

Robert Wright was also a plantation owner and therefore a slave owner. Elizabeth Hyrne reported that he had bought a plantation on the Ashley River in 1725 and by 1730 he was the partial owner of a 12,000-acre barony purchased jointly with George Anson also in the area of the Ashley River which was divided up into tracts and sold. In 1735 Robert added a further 2000 acres to his estate when he purchased an area which became known as Cove Hall or Wrights Bluff on the Santee River.

Robert Wright died from yellow fever in 1739 aged 73 years.  His will is not known to exist and following his death his land and property was distributed to his family and what remained, including ‘a very good parcel of slaves’ was sold by auction at his estate near Dorchester in 1742.  His wife Isabella and his son Sir James Wright pursued his claim for outstanding pay with the South Carolina Assembly and eventually obtained £1000 of the £5000 owed.

Family

Parents 
 Father: Sir Robert Wright, Knight, of Wrangford (c.1634–1689)
 Mother: Susan Wren (born St. Giles in the Fields, London, 25 January 1633 – d.bef.1681), daughter of Matthew Wren, Bishop of Ely

Siblings 
 Susan Wright, sister (d.1730 at Hardwick, Sedgefield) m. Virtue Radford (d.1694) 1687 in Westminster Abbey
 Anne Wright, sister (d.1731 at Hardwick, Sedgefield) m. Freville Lambton (1661–1732) 1695
 Elizabeth Wright, sister (d.1753, buried in London) m. John Rugge 1692
 Alice Wright, sister (1672–1724) m. John Ball (d.1732/3) 1706 in St. Stephen Walbrook, London, both buried in the altar tomb of St. Edmunds, Sedgefield
William Wright, half-brother (b. by 1683)

The seven children of Robert Wright 
 Isabella Wright (1703–1775) m. 1) James Graeme (d.1752); 2) 1755 Dr.Thomas Glen
Anne Wright (1704–1770) m. William Walter (d.1738/39) then married Richard Lambton (possibly son of her father's sister Anne and Freville Lambton)
Robert Wright (1706–1749) m. 1728 Gibbon Cawood (d.1731/32) m. 1733 Mary Blanyer
Charles Wright (1707–1777)
 Jermyn Wright (1711–1799)
Susannah Wright (1717–1763) m. 1737 John Hume (Secretary of the province of Georgia 1779–1781)
 Sir James Wright (1716–1785) m. Sarah Maidman (d.1763).  Governor of Georgia 1760–1782.  Created Baronet in 1772. Buried in Westminster Abbey

Notes

References 

1666 births
1739 deaths
17th-century English judges
18th-century American judges
Chief Justices of the South Carolina Supreme Court
Alumni of Gonville and Caius College, Cambridge
People educated at Eton College
People from Sedgefield